Bruno Conceição de Oliveira (born 10 June 2001), commonly known as Bruno, is a Brazilian footballer who currently plays for Al Jazira.

Career statistics

Club

Notes

References

External links

2001 births
Living people
Brazilian footballers
Brazilian expatriate footballers
Association football wingers
UAE Pro League players
Grêmio Novorizontino players
Al Jazira Club players
Expatriate footballers in the United Arab Emirates
Brazilian expatriate sportspeople in the United Arab Emirates